The Keeper of the Royal Archives is responsible for the papers held in the Royal Archives, and is accountable to The King.

Since 1945, the office of Keeper of the Royal Archives in the Royal Household of the Sovereign of the United Kingdom has been held concurrently with that of Private Secretary to the Sovereign.

References 

 
 

Positions within the British Royal Household